Stesha Carle (born December 2, 1984 in La Habra, California) is an American rower.

References 

1984 births
Living people
American female rowers
People from La Habra, California
World Rowing Championships medalists for the United States
21st-century American women